Abisara freda or Lesser Judy, is a butterfly in the family Riodinidae. It is found in western China.

Subspecies
Abisara freda freda
Abisara freda daliensis Sugiyama, 1992

References

Butterflies described in 1957
Abisara